Andrew Dindar (born 26 June 1942) is a former South African born English first-class cricketer.  Dindar was a right-handed batsman who bowled right-arm medium pace and who occasionally fielded as a wicketkeeper.  He was born at Johannesburg, Transvaal.

Dindar made his first-class debut for Gloucestershire in the 1962 County Championship against Leicestershire.  From 1962 to 1963, he represented the county in 7 first-class matches, the last of which came against Worcestershire.  In his 7 first-class matches, he scored 100 runs at a batting average of 12.50, with a single half century high score of 55.  With the ball he took 3 wickets at a bowling average of 23.33, with best figures of 3/32.  He left Gloucestershire at the end of the 1963 season.

Some thirteen years later he joined Hertfordshire.  His debut in the Minor Counties Championship for the county came against Buckinghamshire in the 1976 Minor Counties Championship.  From 1976 to 1980, he represented the county in 20 matches, the last of which came against Durham.

In 1981, Dindar joined Berkshire, making his debut for the county in the 1981 Minor Counties Championship against Buckinghamshire.  From 1981 to 1984, he represented the county in 28 Minor Counties Championship matches, the last of which came in the 1984 Championship when Berkshire played Devon.  Dindar played one match in the MCCA Knockout Trophy for Berkshire against Norfolk, and also played a single List-A match for Berkshire, against Yorkshire in the 1983 NatWest Trophy.

References

External links
Andy Dindar at Cricinfo

1942 births
Living people
Cricketers from Johannesburg
English sportspeople of South African descent
English cricketers
Gloucestershire cricketers
Hertfordshire cricketers
Berkshire cricketers
English cricketers of 1946 to 1968
English cricketers of 1969 to 2000